Manoj Kishorbhai Kotak is an Indian politician. He is a member of the Bharatiya Janata Party. He has served Lok Sabha, Parliament of India from  Mumbai North East since 2019. He served 3-terms as a Corporator in the Brihanmumbai Municipal Corporation and was leader of the Bharatiya Janata Party in the Corporation.

Kotak, BJP candidate, won in 2019 Indian general elections against National Congress party (NCP) candidate Sanjay Dina Patil in North East constituency of Mumbai by a margin of 2.26 lakh votes.

Positions held 

 Member of Parliament, Mumbai North-East Parliamentary Constituency.2019
 Member, Parliamentary Standing Committee on Finance.
 Member, Parliamentary Standing Committee on Commerce.
 Member, Consultative Committee for Ministry of Shipping, Government of India.
 Municipal Corporator, MCGM (2007 - till date)
 Improvements Committee Chairman, MCGM.(2009–10) 
 Education Committee Chairman, MCGM.(2013–14)
 BJP Group Leader, MCGM.(2019 onwards) 
 Member, Standing Committee, MCGM.
 Member, Mumbai Metropolitan Region Development Authority.

References

External links
 Official biographical sketch in Parliament of India website

Bharatiya Janata Party politicians from Maharashtra
India MPs 2019–present
Lok Sabha members from Maharashtra
Living people
People from Mumbai
1972 births